Minnie Minnich (January 26, 1889 - February 28, 1941) was an American politician who served one term in the Kansas House of Representatives representing the 69th District in Sumner County, Kansas. A social worker and resident of Wellington, Kansas, she was elected in 1920 as part of the second group of women elected to the Kansas Legislature, serving with Rep. Minnie J. Grinstead, Rep. Nellie Cline and Rep. Ida Walker.

1921-1922 Kansas House of Representatives Committee Assignments
 Agriculture
 Cities of the Second Class
 Employees
 Public Utilities
 State Institutions

References

Republican Party members of the Kansas House of Representatives
People from Sumner County, Kansas
Women state legislators in Kansas
1889 births
1941 deaths
People from Wellington, Kansas
20th-century American politicians
20th-century American women politicians